This article is about the particular significance of the year 1994 to Nigeria and its people.

Incumbents

Federal government 
 Head of State: Sani Abacha
 Chief of General Staff: Oladipo Diya
 Chief of Defence Staff: Oladipo Diya
 Chief Justice: Mohammed Bello

Governors 
 Adamawa State: 
 Akwa Ibom State: 
 Anambra State: 
 Bendel State: 
 Benue State: 
 Borno State: 
 Cross River State: 
 Delta State: 
 Edo State: 
 Gongola State: 
 Imo State: 
 Jigawa State: 
 Kaduna State: 
 Kano State: 
 Katsina State: 
 Kebbi State: 
 Kogi State: 
 Kwara State: 
 Lagos State: 
 Niger State: 
 Ogun State: 
 Osun State: 
 Oyo State:
 Taraba State: 
 Yobe State:

Events

June
 June 3 and 4 - The Democratic Alternative, a Nigerian opposition political party, is established in Benin City by about 200 Nigerians critical of the military politicians

December
 19 - Nigeria Airways Flight 9805 crashes in marshland near Kiri Kasama

Unknown
 Crown F.C. football club established
 Spotlight F.C. football club established

Births
 February 14 - Hannah Rueben, wrestler
 June 4 - Aaron Samuel Olanare, footballer
 August 18 - Bukola Abogunloko, sprinter who competed in the 2012 Summer Olympics

Deaths
 June 27 - Tai Solarin, educator and author who established the Mayflower School in Ikenne (born 1922)

References

 
Years of the 20th century in Nigeria
Nigeria